Tetraschalis arachnodes is a moth of the family Pterophoridae. It is found in Australia, including New South Wales.

The wingspan is about 20 mm.

External links
Australian Insects
Australian Faunal Directory

Moths of Australia
Pterophorinae
Moths described in 1887
Taxa named by Edward Meyrick